The Manyu River rises near Wabanein the Upper Banyang Subdivision of the Manyu Department of the Southwest Region, Cameroon. 
The river runs past the southern border of the Mone River Forest Reserve. Below Mamfe, it is joined by rivers draining the Takamanda Forest Reserve and the Cross River National Park in neighboring Nigeria. These protected areas are important habitats for the critically endangered Cross River gorilla.
Around the Nigerian border the river takes the name of the Cross River.

References

Riu Manyu

ca:Riu Cross#Nom de la secció